Carpenedolo is a town and comune in the province of Brescia, in Lombardy, northern Italy.

References

Cities and towns in Lombardy